Zinovy or Zinovii is a Russian and Ukrainian male given name, and may refer to:

Bogdan Zinovy Mikhailovich Khmelnitsky (1595–1657), hetman of the Zaporozhian Cossack Hetmanate of the Crown of the Kingdom of Poland
Zinovy Petrovovich Feldman (1893–1942), Russian Jewish composer
Zinovy Levovich Feldman (ru) (1919–1989), Soviet film director
Zinovy Gerdt (1916–1996), Soviet/Russian theatre and cinema actor, recognized with the title People's Artist of the USSR
Zinovy Moiseevich Vilensky (1899–1984), Russian sculptor who worked and lived in Moscow
Zinovy Peshkov (1884–1966), Russian-born French general and diplomat
Zinovy Reichstein, Russian-born American mathematician
Zinovy Roizman (1941–2022), Russian film and animation director and screenwriter
Zinovy Rozhestvensky (1848–1909), admiral of the Imperial Russian Navy
Zinovy Serdyuk (1903–1982), Moldavian politician
Zinovy Shulman (1924–2007) Belarusian hydrodynamics engineer
Zinovy Vysokovsky (1932–2009), Soviet and Russian theater and movie actor and variety performer
Zinovy Zinik (born 1945), novelist and broadcaster

Russian masculine given names
Ukrainian masculine given names